Air Guadeloupe  was a small French international airline with its head office in Les Abymes, Guadeloupe, France. At one time, it was on the property of Le Raizet Airport. Later it was located in the Immeuble Le Caducet.

Company history
The small airline was founded on 21 May 1970 as Société Antillaise de Transport Aérien, SATA to soon become known as Air Guadeloupe. Operations began in 1994 and the CEO was Francois Paneole. In 2000 it was merged with Air Martinique, Air Saint Barthélémy, and Air Saint Martin to form Air Caraïbes.

Historical destinations served

Caribbean destinations

DCF - Dominica, Dominica - Canefield Airport
DOM - Dominica, Dominica - Melville Hall Airport
FDF - Fort De France, Martinique - Martinique Aimé Césaire International Airport
GBJ - Maria Galante, Guadeloupe - Marie-Galante Airport (or Les Bases Airport)
DSD - La Désirade, Gaudeloupe - La Désirade Airport (or Grande-Anse Airport)
LSS - Les Saintes, Guadeloupe - Les Saintes Airport (or Terre-de-Haut Airport)
PAP - Port-au-Prince, Haiti - Toussaint Louverture International Airport
SDQ - Santo Domingo, Dominican Republic - Las Américas International Airport
SFG - Grand-Case, St-Martin - L'Espérance Airport
SJU - San Juan, Puerto Rico - Luis Muñoz Marín International Airport
SXM - St Maarten, Netherlands Antilles - Princess Juliana International Airport

South America Destinations

CAY - Cayenne, French Guiana Rochambeau - Cayenne-Rochambeau Airport

Historical fleet

(For current aircraft flown, see Air Caraïbes.)

2 - de Havilland Canada DHC-6 Twin Otter configured for Y19 passengers
4 - Dornier 228-200 configured for Y19 passengers
2 - ATR-42-300 configured for Y50 passengers
1 - ATR-72-200 configured for Y70 passengers
1 - Boeing 737-200 leased from Air Caraibes, in Air Guadeloupe colors

Accidents and incidents

21 December 1972 - A Twin Otter operated a flight on behalf of Air France from Guadeloupe to St. Maarten, another island in the Caribbean. It crashed at night, near the island of St. Maarten. All 11 passengers and two crew members died.
18 November 1978 - A Twin Otter struck the water with its left wingtip while flying in a violent squall with a 200–300 feet ceiling. The aircraft crashed and sank in 13m of water. Fifteen of the 20 occupants (including one flight crew) died (see external link below).

References

External links

Data 
Timetable Images
AirTimes Timetables
Accident reports
JetPhotos

Airlines established in 1969
Airlines disestablished in 2000
Defunct airlines of Guadeloupe
Air Caraïbes
Defunct airlines of France